This is a list of state, local and territory officials who have formally endorsed or voiced support for Barack Obama as the Democratic Party's presidential nominee for the 2008 U.S. presidential election
No listing for Colorado found.

Alabama 
Alabama State Rep. Merika Coleman (D-Birmingham)

Arizona

Arizona State Rep. Ed Ableser (D-Tempe)
Arizona State Rep. Steve Gallardo (D-Phoenix)
Arizona State Rep. Kyrsten Sinema (D-Phoenix)
Arizona State Rep. Steve Farley (D-Tucson)
Tucson City Council Regina Romero
Tucson City Council Nina Trasoff
Tucson City Council Shirley Scott
Tucson City Council Karin Uhlich
Tucson City Council Steve Leal (Arizona)
County Recorder F. Ann Rodriguez (D-Tucson)
Former Arizona State Rep. Ted Downing (D-Tucson)
Congressman Raul Grijalva (D-Tucson)

Arkansas
Clerk of the Pulaski County circuit court Pat O'Brien (D-Little Rock)

California

State
State Assembly
Speaker of the California Assembly Karen Bass (D-Los Angeles)
California Assemblymember Ted Lieu (D-El Segundo)
California Assemblymember Sandré Swanson (D-Alameda)
California Assemblymember Lori Saldana (D-San Diego)
California Assemblymember Mike Davis (D-Los Angeles)
Fmr. California Assemblymember Wilma Chan (D-Oakland)
California State Sen. Gil Cedillo (D-Los Angeles)
State Senate
California State Sen. Alan Lowenthal (D-Long Beach)
California State Sen. Mark Ridley-Thomas (D-Culver City)
California State Sen. Leland Yee (D-San Francisco)

Local
Fmr. California State Sen. Martha Escutia (D-Los Angeles)
Member of the San Francisco Board of Supervisors Tom Ammiano
West Hollywood City Councilman Jeffrey Prang
West Hollywood Mayor John Duran
Los Angeles County Supervisor and Fmr. U.S. Rep. Yvonne Brathwaite Burke
Los Angeles City Council President Eric Garcetti
Los Angeles City Councilman Bernard C. Parks
Los Angeles City Councilman Bill Rosendahl
Fmr. California State Controller Steve Westly
San Francisco District Attorney Kamala Harris
San Francisco School Board member Jane Kim

Connecticut
Connecticut State Rep. William Tong (D-Stamford, New Canaan)
Connecticut State Treasurer Denise Nappier

Delaware
Delaware Lt. Gov.  John Carney  (D)
Delaware Treasurer  Jack Markell  (D)

Florida
Florida State Rep. Keith Fitzgerald (D-Sarasota)
Florida State Rep. Betty Reed (D-Tampa Bay)
Sarasota City Commissioner Fredd Atkins
Chair of the Tampa City Council Gwendolyn M. Miller
Tampa City Councilwoman Mary Mulhern
Tampa City Councilwoman Linda Saul-Sena
New Smyrna Beach Councilman Robert E. Miller
Biscayne Park Commissioner Steve Bernard (Independent)

Georgia
Georgia State Sen. Kasim Reed (D-Atlanta)

Hawaii
Hawaii State Sen. Russell S. Kokubun (D-Honolulu)
Hawaii State Sen. Clarence K. Nishihara (D-Honolulu)
Hawaii State Rep. Della Au Belatti (D-Honolulu)
Hawaii State Rep. Jon Karamatsu (D-Honolulu)
Hawaii State Rep. Scott Saiki (D-Honolulu)
Fmr. Hawaii State Rep. Brian Schatz (D-Honolulu)

Idaho
Idaho State Sen. David Langhorst (D-Boise), Senate Assistant Minority Leader
Idaho State Sen. Clint Stennett, (D-Ketchum), Senate Minority Leader
Idaho State Rep. Wendy Jaquet (D-Ketchum), House Minority Leader
Idaho State Rep. Nicole LeFavour (D-Boise)

Illinois

House of Representatives
Illinois State Rep. Annazette Collins (D-Chicago)
Illinois State Rep. Marlow H. Colvin (D-Chicago)
Illinois State Rep. Monique D. Davis (D-Chicago)
Illinois State Rep. William Davis (D-Homewood)
Illinois State Rep. Lisa Dugan (D-Kankakee)
Illinois State Rep. Kenneth Dunkin (D-Chicago)
Illinois State Rep. Sara Feigenholtz (D-Chicago)
Illinois State Rep. Mary E. Flowers (D-Chicago)
Illinois State Rep. LaShawn Ford (D-Chicago)
Illinois State Rep. Esther Golar (D-Chicago)
Illinois State Rep. Careen Gordon (D-Coal City)
Illinois State Rep. Deborah L. Graham (D-Chicago)
Illinois State Rep. Constance A. Howard (D-Chicago)
Illinois State Rep. Elga L. Jefferies (D-Chicago)
Illinois State Rep. Charles E. Jefferson (D-Rockford)
Illinois State Rep. Frank Mautino (D-Spring Valley)
Illinois State Rep. Jack McGuire (D-Joliet)
Illinois State Rep. David E. Miller (D-Calumet City)
Illinois State Rep. Milton Patterson (D-Chicago)
Illinois State Rep. Al Riley (D-Matteson)
Illinois State Rep. Arthur Turner (D-Chicago)
Illinois State Rep. Eddie Washington (D-Waukegan)
Illinois State Rep. Karen Yarbrough (D-Maywood)
Illinois State Rep. Wyvetter H. Younge (D-East St. Louis)

Senate
Illinois State Senate President and Sen. Emil Jones (D-Chicago)
Illinois State Sen. James Clayborne Jr. (D-Belleville)
Illinois State Sen. Debbie Halvorson (D-Crete)
Illinois State Sen. Rickey R. Hendon (D-Chicago)
Illinois State Sen. Mattie Hunter (D-Chicago)
Illinois State Sen. Kimberly A. Lightford (D-Chicago)
Illinois State Sen. Iris Martinez (D-Chicago)
Illinois State Sen. James Meeks (D-Chicago)
Illinois State Sen. Kwame Raoul (D-Chicago)
Illinois State Sen. Donne Trotter (D-Chicago)
Fmr. Illinois State Sen. Patrick Welch (D-Peru)

Constitutional Officers
Illinois Attorney General Lisa Madigan (D-Chicago)
Illinois Secretary of State Jesse White (D-Alton)
Illinois State Comptroller Daniel Hynes (D-Chicago)
Margie Gavin Woods, Superdelegate, Minority Leader of the Will County Board and a member of the Democratic National Committee
Jack Mazzotti, Christian County Democratic Chairman (First Endorsing U.S. County)

Indiana

House of Representatives
Indiana State Rep. Dennis Avery (D-Evansville)
Indiana State Rep. Jeb Bardon (D-Indianapolis)
Indiana State Rep. John Bartlett (D-Indianapolis)
Indiana State Rep. Charlie Brown (D-Gary)
Indiana State Rep. Bill Crawford (D-Indianapolis)
Indiana State Rep. Dave Crooks (D-Washington)
Indiana State Rep. John Day (D-Indianapolis)
Indiana State Rep. Chet Dobis (D-Merrillville), Speaker Pro Tempore
Indiana State Rep. Ryan Dvorak (D-South Bend)
Indiana State Rep. Dale Grubb (D-Covington), Democratic Caucus Chair
Indiana State Rep. Phil Hoy (D-Evansville)
Indiana State Rep. Linda Lawson (D-Hammond)
Indiana State Rep. Scott Pelath (D-Michigan City)
Indiana State Rep. Matt Pierce (D-Bloomington)
Indiana State Rep. Greg Porter (D-Indianapolis)
Indiana State Rep. Mara Candelaria Reardon (D-Munster)
Indiana State Rep. Scott Reske (D-Pendleton)
Indiana State Rep. Vernon Smith (D-Gary)
Indiana State Rep. Russ Stilwell (D-Boonville), Democratic Floor Leader
Indiana State Rep. Vanessa Summers (D-Indianapolis)
Indiana State Rep. Trent Van Haaften (D-Mount Vernon)

Senate
Indiana State Sen. John Broden (South Bend)
Indiana State Sen. Timothy Lanane (D-Anderson)
Indiana State Sen. Lindel Hume (D-Princeton)
Indiana State Sen. Earline S. Rogers (D-Gary)

Iowa

House of Representatives
Iowa State Rep. Ako Abdul-Samad (D-Des Moines) 
Iowa State Rep. Deborah Berry (D-Waterloo) 
Iowa State Rep. Elesha Gayman (D-Des Moines)
Iowa State Rep. David Jacoby (D-Coralville)
Iowa State Rep. Pam Jochum (D-Dubuque)
Iowa State Rep. Helen Miller (D-Fort Dodge)
Iowa State Rep. Donovan Olson (D-Boone)
Iowa State Rep. Tyler Olson (D-Cedar Rapids)
Iowa State Rep. Janet Petersen (D-Des Moines)
Iowa State Rep. Brian Quirk (D-Des Moines)
Iowa State Rep. Mark Smith (D-Marshalltown)

Senate
Iowa State Sen. Joe Bolkcom (D-Iowa City)
Iowa State Sen. Robert Dvorsky (D-Coralville)
Iowa State Sen. Bill Heckroth (D-Waverly)
Iowa State Sen. Rich Olive (D-Story City)
Iowa State Sen. Tom Rielly (D-Oskaloosa)
Iowa State Sen. Steve Warnstadt (D-Sioux City)
Iowa State Sen. Frank Wood (D-Eldridge)

Constitutional officers
Iowa Attorney General Tom Miller (D-Dubuque)
Iowa State Treasurer Michael Fitzgerald
Fmr. Chairman of the Iowa Democratic Party Gordon R. Fischer

Local elected officials
Story County Democratic Chair Jan Bauer
Page County Democratic Chair Dennis Cole
Guthrie County Democratic Chair John Cramer
Benton County Democratic Chair Ron Donald
Schilling-Greene County Democratic Chair Nicole Friess
Hancock County Democratic Chair Gloria Goll
Iowa County Democratic Chair Steve Hanson
Franklin County Democratic Chair Vern Harper
Carroll County Democratic Chair Howard "Butch" Heisterkamp
Appanoose County Democratic Chair Jim Jameson
Monroe County Democratic Chair Joe Judge
Fremont County Democratic Chair Brian Kingsolver
Humboldt County Democratic Chair Terry Kocker
Boone County Democratic Chair Becky Lyon
Lucas County Democratic Chair Buzz Malone
Audubon County Democratic Chair Bob Nelson
Van Buren County Democratic Chair Steve Prickett
Winnebago County Democratic Chair John Ralls
Sioux County Democratic Chair Carl Vandermeulen
Pott County Democratic Chair Chuck Wredt

Kansas

House of Representatives
Kansas State Rep. Paul Davis (D-Lawrence)
Kansas State Rep. Oletha Faust-Goudeau (D-Wichita)
Kansas State Rep. Tom Hawk (D-Manhattan)
Kansas State Rep. Broderick Henderson (D-Kansas City)
Kansas State Rep. Harold Lane (D-Topeka)
Kansas State Rep. Melody McCray-Miller (D-Wichita)
Kansas State Rep. Cindy Neighbor (D-Shawnee)
Kansas State Rep. Candy Ruff (D-Leavenworth)
Kansas State Rep. Valdenia Winn (D-Kansas City)

Senate
Kansas State Senate Minority Leader Anthony Hensley (D-Topeka)
Kansas State Sen. Donald Betts (D-Wichita)
Kansas State Sen. Marci Francisco (D-Lawrence)
Kansas State Sen. David Haley (D-Kansas City)
Kansas State Sen. Chris Steineger (D-Kansas City)

Kentucky

State
Kentucky Lieutenant Governor Daniel Mongiardo (D-KY)
Kentucky State Sen. Gerald Neal (D-Louisville)
Kentucky State Sen. Ernesto Scorsone (D-Fayette)
Fmr. Kentucky State Sen. Nicholas Kafoglis (D-Warren)
Fmr. Kentucky State Sen. David Karem (D-Jefferson)
Fmr. Kentucky State Sen. Michael Moloney (D-Fayette)
Fmr. Kentucky State Sen. Danny Meyer (D-Oldham) 
Fmr. Kentucky State Sen. Georgia Davis Powers (D-Jefferson)
Fmr. Kentucky State Sen. Tim Shaughnessy (D-Jefferson)
Kentucky State Rep. Leslie Combs (D-Pike)
Kentucky State Rep. Jim Glenn (D-Daviess)
Kentucky State Rep. Dennis Keene (D-Campbell) 
Kentucky State Rep. Reginald Meeks (D-Louisville)
Kentucky State Rep. Darryl Owens (D-Jefferson)
Kentucky State Rep. Ruth Ann Palumbo (D-Fayette)
Kentucky State Rep. Jim Wayne (D-Jefferson) 
Kentucky State Rep. Susan Westrom (D-Fayette)
Fmr. Kentucky State Rep. David Tandy
Fmr. State Treasurer Jonathan Miller (D-Fayette)

County
Fmr. Franklin County Judge William Graham (D-Franklin)
County Judge Executive Darrell Link (D-Grant) 
County Judge Executive Billy O’Banion (D-Owen)
Fmr. Circuit Judge Lewis Paisley (D-Fayette)
Campbell County Commissioner, Ken Rechtin (D-Campbell)
County Commonwealth Attorney Gordie Shaw (D-Woodford)

City
Fmr. Louisville Councilman Bill Allison (D-Jefferson) 
Fmr. Councilwoman Denise Bentley (D-Jefferson) 
Elizabethtown City Council Member Anthony Bishop (D-Hardin) 
Fmr. City Council Member George Brown (D-Fayette) 
Councilwoman Cheri Bryant Hamilton (D-Jefferson)
Louisville Councilman Tom Owen (D-Jefferson) 
Councilwoman Barbara Shanklin (D-Jefferson) 
Bardstown City Council Member Bill Sheckles (D-Nelson) 
Louisville Councilman David Tandy (D-Jefferson) 
Councilman George Unseld (D-Jefferson) 
Councilwoman Mary Woolridge (D-Jefferson)

Louisiana
Louisiana State Sen. Lydia P. Jackson (D-Shreveport)
Louisiana State Rep. Rick Gallot Jr. (D-Ruston)
Louisiana State Rep. Avon Honey (D-Baton Rouge)
Louisiana State Rep. Karen Carter Peterson (D-New Orleans)

Maine
Maine State House Speaker Glenn A. Cummings (D-Portland)

Maryland

State
House of Delegates
Maryland State Del. Curt Anderson (D-Chairman Baltimore City Delegation)
Maryland State Del. Saqib Ali (D-Montgomery)
Maryland State Del. and House Majority Leader Kumar P. Barve (D-Montgomery)
Maryland State Del. Elizabeth Bobo (D-Howard)
Maryland State Del. Talmadge Branch (D-Baltimore City)
Maryland State Del. Aisha Braveboy (D-Prince George's)
Maryland State Del. William A. Bronrott (D-Montgomery)
Maryland State Del. Emmett C. Burns Jr. (D-Baltimore)
Maryland State Del. Rudolph C. Cane (D-Eastern Shore)
Maryland State Del. Jill P. Carter (D-Baltimore City)
Maryland State Del. Ann Marie Doory (D-Baltimore City)
Maryland State Del. Brian J. Feldman (D-Montgomery)
Maryland State Del. William Frick (D-Montgomery)
Maryland State Del. James W. Gilchrist (D-Montgomery)
Maryland State Del. Cheryl Glenn (D-Baltimore City) 
Maryland State Del. Guy Guzzone (D-Howard) 
Maryland State Del. Hattie Harrison (D-Baltimore City)
Maryland State Del. Keith E. Haynes (D-Baltimore City)
Maryland State Del. Marvin E. Holmes Jr. (D-Prince George's) 
Maryland State Del. James Hubbard (D-Prince George's) 
Maryland State Del. Tom Hucker (D-Montgomery)
Maryland State Del. Jolene Ivey (D-Prince George's)
Maryland State Del. Sue Kullen (D-Calvert)
Maryland State Del. Gerron Levi (D-Prince George's) 
Maryland State Del. Dan K. Morhaim(D-Baltimore County)
Maryland State Del. Nathaniel T. Oaks (D-Baltimore City)
Maryland State Del. Joseline Pena-Melnyk (D-Prince George's)
Maryland State Del. James Proctor (D-Prince George's) 
Maryland State Del. Kirill Reznik (D-Montgomery)
Maryland State Del. Barbara Robinson (D-Baltimore City)
Maryland State Del. Samuel I. Rosenberg (D-Baltimore City)
Maryland State Del. Victor R. Ramirez (D-Prince George's)
Maryland State Del. Justin Ross (D-Prince George's) 
Maryland State Del. Shawn Z. Tarrant (D-Baltimore City)
Maryland State Del. Herman L. Taylor Jr. (D-Montgomery)
Maryland State Del. Veronica L. Turner (D-Prince George's)
Maryland State Del. Jay Walker (D-Prince George's)
Senate
Maryland State Sen. James Brochin (D-Baltimore)
Maryland State Sen. Joan Carter Conway (D-Baltimore City)
Maryland State Sen. Ulysses Currie (D-Prince George's)
Maryland State Sen. Nathaniel Exum (D-Prince George's)
Maryland State Sen. Brian E. Frosh (D-Montgomery)
Maryland State Sen. Robert J. Garagiola (D-Rockville)
Maryland State Sen. Lisa Gladden (D-Baltimore)
Maryland State Sen. David C. Harrington (D-Prince George's)
Maryland State Sen. Verna L. Jones (D-Baltimore)
Maryland State Sen. Delores G. Kelley (D-Baltimore)
Maryland State Sen. Nathaniel J. McFadden (D-Baltimore)
Maryland State Sen. Thomas M. Middleton (D-Charles)
Maryland State Sen. C. Anthony Muse (D-Prince George's)
Maryland State Sen. Douglas JJ Peters (D-Prince George's)
Maryland State Sen. Jamie Raskin (D-Montgomery)
Maryland State Sen. James Robey (D-Howard)
Maryland State Sen. Robert Zirkin (D-Baltimore)
Former state officeholders
Fmr. Governor Parris Glendening
Fmr. Maryland State Del. Gil Genn (D-Montgomery)
Fmr. Maryland State Del. Joan Pitkin (D-Prince George's)
Fmr. Maryland State Del. Gareth Murray (D-Montgomery)
Fmr. Maryland State Del. Rushern Baker (D-Prince George's)
Fmr. Maryland State Del. Neil Quinter
Maryland Attorney General Doug Gansler
Fmr. Attorney General Stephen H. Sachs
Maryland State Comptroller Peter Franchot (D-MD)
Maryland State Board of Education Student Member Renford G. Freemantle

County
Anne Arundel County Councilman Jamie Benoit
Anne Arundel County Councilman Joshua J. Cohen
Anne Arundel County Councilman Daryl Jones
Baltimore County Councilman Kenneth Oliver
Baltimore County Councilman Vince Gardina
Calvert Board of County Commissioners President Wilson Parran
Charles County Commissioner Reuben Collins II
Frederick County Board of Education Student Membar Neha Kapoor
Harford County Councilwoman Mary Ann Lisanti
Howard County Executive Kenneth Ulman
Howard County Councilman Calvin Ball
Howard County Councilwoman Jennifer Terrasa
Kent County Commissioner William Pickrum 
Montgomery County Councilman Roger Berliner
Montgomery County Councilman Marc Elrich
Montgomery County Council Chair Michael Knapp
Montgomery County State's Attorney John McCarthy
Montgomery County Board of Education Member Stephen Abrams
Montgomery County Board of Education Member Chris Barclay
Montgomery County Board of Education Member Dr. Judy Docca
Montgomery County Board of Education Member Ben Moskowitz
Montgomery County Central Committee Member Marie Wallace
Prince George's County Councilman William Campos
Prince George's County Councilman Samuel Dean
Prince George's County Councilwoman Camille Exum
Prince George's County Councilman Tony Knotts
Prince George's County Councilman Eric Olson
Prince George's County State's Attorney Glenn F. Ivey
Prince George's County Sheriff Michael Jackson
Prince George's County Board of Education Member Pat Fletcher
Prince George's County Board of Education Member Heather Iliff
Queen Anne's County Commissioner Courtney Billups
Queen Anne's County Commissioner Gene Ransom

Local
Annapolis Alderwoman Sheila Finlayson
Annapolis Alderwoman Classie Gillis Hoyle
Annapolis Alderman Sam Shropshire
Baltimore Mayor Sheila Dixon
Baltimore City State's Attorney Pat Jessamy
Baltimore City Council President Stephanie Rawlings Blake
Baltimore City Councilman William B. Henry
Baltimore City Councilwoman Helen Holton
Baltimore City Councilwoman Sharon Middleton
Fmr. Baltimore City Councilman Keiffer J. Mitchell Jr.
Bladensburg Town Councilman Chris Mendoza 
Bowie Town Councilman Dennis Brady
Bowie Town Councilman Isaac Trouth
Fmr. Bowie Mayor Gary Allen
Fmr. Centerville Town Council President Mary McCarthy
Cheverly Town Councilman Micah Watson
College Park City Councilman Patrick Wojahn
College Park City Councilman Mark Cook
Easton Town Councilwoman Moonyene Jackson-Amis
Edmonston Mayor Adam Ortiz
Gaithersburg City Councilman Mike Sesma
Gaithersburg City Councilman Ryan Spiegel
Laurel Town Council Chairman Fred Smalls
Laurel Town Councilwoman Jan Robinson
Laurel Town Councilman Michael Sarich
Fmr. Mount Airy Town Council President John Medve
Pocomoke City Councilwoman Tracey Cottman
Fmr. Riverdale Park Council Member Novella Sargusingh
Rockville Town Councilman Piotr Gajewski
Takoma Park Mayor Bruce William
Takoma Park City Councilman Terry Seamens
Takoma Park City Councilman Josh Wright
Washington Grove Town Councilman Darrell Anderson
Gustavo Torres, Executive Director, CASA de Maryland*
Democratic nominee for Maryland's 4th congressional district Donna Edwards 
Democratic National Committee Member Mary Jo Neville
Democratic National Committee Member Karren Pope-Onwukwe
Democratic National Committee Member Greg Pecoraro

Massachusetts
Massachusetts State Sen. Benjamin Downing (D-Pittsfield)
Massachusetts State Sen. Dianne Wilkerson (D-Boston)
Massachusetts State Rep. Jamie Eldridge (D-Acton)
Massachusetts State Rep. Linda Dorcena Forry (D-Boston)
Massachusetts State Rep. John H. Rogers (D-Norwood)
Massachusetts State Rep. Michael F. Rush (D-Boston)
Boston City Council Councilman Michael F. Flaherty
Boston City Councilman Michael P. Ross
Boston City Councilman Charles Yancey
Boston City Councilman Sam Yoon

Michigan
Michigan State Sen. Hansen Clarke (D-Detroit)
Michigan State Rep. Bert Johnson (D-Highland Park) 
Michigan State Rep. Aldo Vagnozzi (D-Farmington Hills) 
Michigan State Rep. Coleman Young II (D-Detroit)
Hamtramck Mayor Karen Majewski
Hamtramck Mayor pro tem Scott Klein
Hamtramck City Councilmember Catrina Stackpoole

Minnesota

House
Minnesota State Rep. John Benson (D-Minnetonka)
Minnesota State Rep. Augustine 'Willie' Dominguez
Minnesota State Rep. Tim Faust (D-Mora)
Minnesota State Rep. Frank Hornstein
Minnesota State Rep. Mike Jaros
Minnesota State Rep. John Lesch

Senate
Minnesota State Sen. Terri Bonoff (D-Hopkins)
Minnesota State Sen. Dick Cohen (D-Saint Paul)
Minnesota State Sen. John Marty (D-Roseville)
Minnesota State Sen. Katie Sieben (D-Newport)
Minnesota State Sen. Patricia Torres Ray (D-Minneapolis)

Local
Duluth Council Member Tony Cuneo
Minneapolis Council Member Elizabeth Glidden
Minneapolis Council Member Betsy Hodges
Minneapolis Council Member Robert Lilligren
Minneapolis Council Member Paul Ostrow
Minneapolis Council Member Ralph Remington
Minneapolis Council Member Don Samuels
St. Paul Council Member Russ Stark
St. Paul Council Member Pat Harris

Missouri
Missouri State Rep. Maria Chappelle-Nadal (D-University City)
Missouri State Auditor Susan Montee

Montana

House
Montana State Rep. Mary Caferro (D-Helena)
Montana State Rep. Bob Ebinger (D-Livingston)
Montana State Rep. Ron Erickson (D-Missoula)
Montana State Rep. Dave Gallik (D-Helena)
Montana State Rep. Galen Hollenbaugh (D-Helena)
Montana State Rep. Jim Keane (D-Butte)
Montana State Rep. Dave McAlpin (D-Missoula), Minority Whip
Montana State Rep. Mike Phillips (D-Bozeman)
Montana State Rep. Michele Reinhart (D-Missoula)
Montana State Rep. Kendall Van Dyk (D-Billings)
Montana State Rep. Jonathan Windy Boy (D-Box Elder), also a councilman for the Chippewa Cree Tribe
Fmr. Montana State Rep. Paul Clark (D-Trout Creek)
Fmr. Montana State Rep. Eve Franklin (D-Great Falls)
Fmr. Montana State Rep. Ray Peck (D-Havre)
Fmr. Montana State Rep. Bill Whitehead (D-Wolf Point)

Senate
Montana State Sen. Larry Jent (D-Bozeman)
Montana State Sen. Jesse Laslovich (D-Anaconda)
Montana State Sen. Greg Lind (D-Missoula)
Montana State Sen. Don Ryan (D-Great Falls)
Montana State Sen. Frank Smith (D-Poplar)
Montana State Sen. Dave Wanzenreid (D-Missoula)
Fmr. Montana State Sen. Steve Doherty (D-Great Falls)

Statewide
Fmr. Montana Supreme Court Justice Terry Trieweiler
Fmr. Montana Supreme Court Justice Jim Regnier
Supreme Court Clerk Ed Smith
Montana Public Service Commissioner Ken Toole
Montana Public Service Commissioner Greg Jergeson
Montana Public Service Commissioner Bob Raney 
James Steele Jr., chairman of the Confederated Salish and Kootenai Tribes

Local
Lewis and Clark County Commissioner Andy Hunthausen 
Lewis and Clark County Commissioner Ed Tinsley, a superdelegate
Roosevelt County attorney Ryan Rusche
Missoula City Council member Dave Strohmaier
Missoula City Council member Jason Weiner 
Missoula City Council member Pam Walzer

Nebraska
Democratic State Chairman Steve Achelpohl
Chairman of the Democratic National Committee's Native American Caucus in Nebraska Frank LaMere
National Committeewoman Kathleen Fahey of Omaha
National Committeeman Vince Powers of Lincoln

Nevada
Nevada State Sen. Steven Horsford (D-North Las Vegas)
Nevada State Sen. Mike Schneider (D-Las Vegas)
Fmr. Nevada State Sen. Helen Foley
Nevada Assemblymember Kelvin Atkinson (D-North Las Vegas)
Nevada Assemblymember Mo Denis (D-Las Vegas)
Nevada Assemblymember Marilyn Kirkpatrick (D-Las Vegas)
Nevada Assemblymember Sheila Leslie (D-Reno)
Nevada Assemblymember Harvey Munford (D-Las Vegas)

New Hampshire
New Hampshire State Rep. Dennis Abbott (D-Newmarket) 
New Hampshire State Rep. Susan Almy (D-Lebanon) 
New Hampshire State Rep. Deborah Billian (D-Rochester) 
New Hampshire State Rep. Elizabeth Blanchard (D-Concord) 
New Hampshire State Rep. David Borden (D-New Castle)
New Hampshire State Rep. Pennington Brown (D-Epping) 
New Hampshire State Rep. Edward Butler (D-Hart's Location) 
New Hampshire State Rep. Kimberley Casey (D-East Kingston) 
New Hampshire State Rep. Jennifer Daler (D-Temple)
New Hampshire State Rep. Eileen Flockhart (D-Exeter) 
New Hampshire State Rep. Jeffrey Fontas (D-Nashua) 
New Hampshire State Rep. John Henson (D-Exeter) 
New Hampshire State Rep. Sarah Hutz (D-Dover) 
New Hampshire State Rep. Jane Kelley (D-Hampton) 
New Hampshire State Rep. Sally Kelly (D-Chichester) 
New Hampshire State Rep. James Kennedy (D-Exeter) 
New Hampshire State Rep. Nickolas Levasseur (D-Manchester) 
New Hampshire State Rep. Sid Lovett (D-Holderness)
New Hampshire State Rep. Jesse Martineau (D-Manchester) 
New Hampshire State Rep. Shawn Mickelonis (D-Rochester) 
New Hampshire State Rep. Bonnie Mitchell (D-Jaffrey) 
New Hampshire State Rep. Sharon Nordgren (D-Hanover) 
New Hampshire State Rep. Kay Oppenheimer (D-Strafford)
New Hampshire State Rep. Margaret Porter (D-Epsom) 
New Hampshire State Rep. James Powers (D-Exeter)
New Hampshire State Rep. Kris Roberts (D-Keene) 
New Hampshire State Rep. Cindy Rosenwald (D-Nashua) 
New Hampshire State Rep. Tara Sad (D-Walpole)
New Hampshire State Rep. Carla Skinder (D-Cornish) 
New Hampshire State Rep. Nancy Warren (D-Rochester) 
New Hampshire State Rep. Lucy Weber (D-Walpole)
New Hampshire State Sen. Peter Burling (D-Cornish)
New Hampshire State Sen. Jacalyn Cilley (D-Berlin)
New Hampshire State Sen. Martha Fuller Clark (D-Portsmouth)
New Hampshire State Sen. Harold Janeway (D-Webster)
Chair of the Rockingham County Democratic Committee Lenore Patton

New Jersey
State
New Jersey State Sen. John Adler (D-Cherry Hill)
New Jersey State Sen. Sandra Bolden Cunningham (D-Jersey City)
New Jersey State Sen. Fred Madden (D-Camden/Gloucester)
New Jersey State Sen. Dana Redd (D-Camden) and DNC Member
New Jersey State Sen. Stephen M. Sweeney (D-Gloucester/Salem/Cumberland), Majority Leader
New Jersey State Sen. Shirley Turner (D-Lawrence)
New Jersey State Sen. Loretta Weinberg (D-Teaneck)
New Jersey Assemblymember Neil M. Cohen (D-Union)
New Jersey Assemblymember Elease Evans (D-Paterson)
New Jersey Assemblymember Linda R. Greenstein (D-Plainsboro)
New Jersey Assemblymember Mila Jasey (D-South Orange)
New Jersey Assemblymember Gordon M. Johnson (D-Englewood)
New Jersey Assemblymember and Washington Township Mayor Paul D. Moriarty (D-Washington Township)
New Jersey Assemblymember L. Harvey Smith (D-Jersey City)
New Jersey Assemblymember L. Grace Spencer (D-Hillside and Newark)
New Jersey Assemblymember Cleopatra Tucker (D-Newark)
County
Burlington County Democratic Party Chairman Richard J. Perr
Camden County Democratic Party Co-Chair & DNC Member Donald Norcross
Camden County Democratic Party Co-Chair James Beach
Fmr. Camden County Democratic Party Chairman George E. Norcross III
Gloucester County Democratic Party Chairman Michael Angelini
Local
Atlantic City Councilwoman Joyce J. Mollineaux
Atlantic City Councilman Marty Small
Camden City Mayor Gwendolyn Faison
Hillside, New Jersey City Councilwoman Shelley-Ann Bates
Margate, New Jersey City Councilwoman Mary M. Slomine
Minor Logan, New Jersey City Councilman Frank Wayne
Poughkeepsie City Councilwoman Gwen C. Johnson
Vineland, New Jersey City Councilman Richard T. Smith

New Mexico
New Mexico State Rep. Joseph Cervantes (D-Las Cruces)
New Mexico State Rep. Nathan P. Cote (D-Las Cruces)
New Mexico State Rep. Antonio Luján (D-Las Cruces)
New Mexico State Majority Leader Rep. W. Ken Martinez (D-Las Cruces)

New York
New York State Sen. Eric Adams (D-Brooklyn)
New York State Sen. Bill Perkins (D-Harlem)
New York State Sen. John L. Sampson (D-Brooklyn)
New York Assemblymember Karim Camara (D-Brooklyn)
New York Assemblymember Hakeem Jeffries (D-Brooklyn)
Young Democrats Club of Pelham (Non-Profit Organization)
New York City Councilman Albert Vann (D-Brooklyn)
Preeta D. Bansal, former Solicitor General of the State of New York (D-NY)

North Carolina
North Carolina Lt. Governor Bev Perdue, candidate for Governor
North Carolina State Treasurer Richard H. Moore, candidate for Governor
North Carolina State Sen. Doug Berger (D-Youngsville)
North Carolina State Sen. Charlie Dannelly (D-Raleigh)
North Carolina State Sen. Katie Dorsett (D-Raleigh)
North Carolina State Sen. Anthony Foriest (D-Graham)
North Carolina State Sen. Linda Garrou (D-Winston-Salem)
North Carolina State Sen. Malcolm Graham (D-Charlotte)
North Carolina State Sen. Clark Jenkins (D-Tarboro)
North Carolina State Sen. Edward Jones (D-Raleigh)
North Carolina State Sen. Eleanor Kinnaird (D-Carrboro)
North Carolina State Sen. Vernon Malone (D-Raleigh)
North Carolina State Sen. Floyd McKissick Jr. (D-Raleigh)
North Carolina State Sen. Tony Rand (D-Fayetteville), Senate Majority Leader
North Carolina State Rep. Alma Adams (D-Greensboro)
North Carolina State Rep. Dan Blue (D-Raleigh), fmr. Speaker of the House
North Carolina State Rep. Angela Bryant (D-Rocky Mount)
North Carolina State Rep. Becky Carney (D-Charlotte)
North Carolina State Rep. Bill Faison (D-Durham)
North Carolina State Rep. Jean Farmer-Butterfield (D-Wilson)
North Carolina State Rep. Rick Glazier (D-Fayetteville)
North Carolina State Rep. Larry Hall (D-Durham)
North Carolina State Rep. Ty Harrell (D-Raleigh)
North Carolina State Rep. Pricey Harrison (D-Greensboro)
North Carolina State Rep. Sandra Hughes (D-Wilmington)
North Carolina State Rep. Marvin Lucas (D-Spring Lake)
North Carolina State Rep. Grier Martin (D-Raleigh)
North Carolina State Rep. Annie Mobley (D-Ahoskie)
North Carolina State Rep. Mickey Michaux (D-Durham)
North Carolina State Rep. Edith Warren (D-Farmville)
North Carolina State Rep. Michael Wray (D-Gaston)
Fmr. State Rep. Phil Baddour (D), fmr. House Democratic Leader
Fmr. State Supreme Court Chief Justice Henry Frye

North Dakota
North Dakota State Sen. Art Behm (D-Niagara)
North Dakota State Sen. Tom Fiebiger (D-Fargo) 
North Dakota State Sen. Joan Heckaman (D-New Rockford) 
North Dakota State Sen. Joel Heitkamp (D-Hankinson) 
North Dakota State Sen. Aaron Krauter (D-Regent) 
North Dakota State Sen. Richard Marcellais (D-Belcourt) 
North Dakota State Sen. Carolyn Nelson (D-Fargo), Assistant Minority Leader
North Dakota State Sen. David O'Connell (D-Lansford), Minority Leader
North Dakota State Sen. Jim Pomeroy (D-Fargo) 
North Dakota State Sen. Tracy Potter (D-Bismarck) 
North Dakota State Sen. Ryan Taylor (D-Towner) 
North Dakota State Sen. John Warner (D-Ryder)
North Dakota State Rep. Tracy Boe (D-Milo)
North Dakota State Rep. Mary Ekstrom (D-Fargo) 
North Dakota State Rep. Rod Froelich (D-Selfridge) 
North Dakota State Rep. Eliot Glassheim (D-Grand Forks) 
North Dakota State Rep. Chris Griffin (D-Larimore) 
North Dakota State Rep. Ed Gruchalla (D-Fargo) 
North Dakota State Rep. Pam Gulleson (D-Rutland) 
North Dakota State Rep. Lyle Hanson (D-Jamestown) 
North Dakota State Rep. Scot Kelsh (D-Fargo) 
North Dakota State Rep. Joe Kroeber (D-Jamestown) 
North Dakota State Rep. Ralph Metcalf (D-Valley City) 
North Dakota State Rep. Louis Pinkerton (D-Minot) 
North Dakota State Rep. Arlo Schmidt (D-Maddock) 
North Dakota State Rep. Jasper Schneider (D-Fargo) 
North Dakota State Rep. Dorvan Solberg (D-Ray) 
North Dakota State Rep. Lisa Wolf (D-Minot) 
North Dakota State Rep. Steve Zaiser (D-Fargo)

Ohio
Ohio State Sen. Capri Cafaro (D-Youngstown)
Ohio State Sen. Eric Kearney (D-Cincinnati)
Ohio State Sen. Tom Roberts (D-Dayton)
Ohio State Sen. Tom Sawyer (D-Akron)
Ohio State Sen. Shirley Smith (D-Cleveland)
Ohio State Rep. Joyce Beatty (D-Columbus), House Minority Leader
Ohio State Rep. Jennifer Brady (D-Cleveland)
Ohio State Rep. Ted Celeste  (D-Columbus)
Ohio State Rep. Robert Hagan (D-Youngstown)
Ohio State Rep. Tom Letson (D-Warren)
Ohio State Rep. Clayton Luckie (D-Dayton)
Ohio State Rep. Dan Stewart (D-Columbus)
Ohio State Rep. Vernon Sykes (D-Akron)
Ohio State Rep. Sandra Williams (D-Cleveland)
Ohio State Rep. Tyrone Yates (D-Cincinnati)
Ohio State State Treasurer Richard Cordray (D-OH)
Chairman of the Cuyahoga County Democratic Party Tim Hagan
Cuyahoga County Commissioner President Peter Lawson Jones

Oklahoma
Oklahoma State Sen. Mike Morgan, Senate President Pro Temp (D-Stillwater)
Oklahoma State Sen. Tom Adelson (D-Tulsa)
Oklahoma State Sen. Andrew Rice (D-Oklahoma City)
Oklahoma State Rep. Jabar Shumate (D-Tulsa)
Oklahoma State Rep. Ryan Dean Kiesel (D-Seminole)

Oregon
Oregon State Sen. Alan Bates (D-Ashland)
Oregon State Sen. Margaret Carter, Senate President Pro Tem (D-Portland)
Oregon State Sen. Avel Gordly (D-Portland)
Oregon State Sen. Floyd Prozanski (D-South Lane and North Douglas Counties)
Oregon State Sen. Ben Westlund (D-Tumalo)
Oregon State Rep. Jeff Barker (D-Aloha)
Oregon State Rep. Phil Barnhart (D-Central Lane and Linn Counties)
Oregon State Rep. Suzanne Bonamici (D-Washington County)
Oregon State Rep. Peter Buckley (D-Ashland)
Oregon State Rep. Ben Cannon (D-Portland)
Oregon State Rep. Brian Clem (D-Salem)
Oregon State Rep. Chris Edwards (D-West Eugene, Santa Clara, Junction City, Cheshire & Alvadore)
Oregon State Rep. David Edwards (D-Hillsboro)
Oregon State Rep. Larry Galizio (D-Tigard)
Oregon State Rep. Paul Holvey (D-Eugene)
Oregon State Rep. Betty Komp (D-Woodburn)
Oregon State Rep. Tina Kotek (D-North/NE Portland)
Oregon State Rep. Jeff Merkley, House Speaker
Oregon State Rep. Mary Nolan (D-Portland)
Oregon State Rep. Tobias Read (D-Beaverton)
Oregon State Rep. Diane Rosenbaum, House Speaker Pro Tem
Oregon State Rep. Mike Schaufler (D-Happy Valley)
Oregon State Rep. Chip Shields (D-Portland)
Oregon State Rep. Brad Witt (D-Clatskanie)
State Treasurer Randall Edwards (D-Portland)
Superintendent of Public Instruction Susan Castillo (D-Eugene)

Pennsylvania
Pennsylvania State Sen. Lisa Boscola (D-Lehigh Valley)
Pennsylvania State Sen. Vincent Hughes (D-Philadelphia), Caucus Secretary
Pennsylvania State Sen. Shirley Kitchen (D-Philadelphia)
Pennsylvania State Sen. Robert J. Mellow (D-Lackawanna), Minority Floor Leader
Pennsylvania State Sen. Anthony H. Williams (D-Philadelphia)
Pennsylvania State Rep. Mark B. Cohen (D-Philadelphia)
Pennsylvania State Rep. Harold James (D-Pittsburgh)
Pennsylvania State Rep. Tony Payton (D-Philadelphia)
Pennsylvania State Rep. Joseph Preston Jr. (D-Allegheny)
Pennsylvania State Rep. Josh Shapiro (D-Montgomery)
Pennsylvania State Rep. Chelsa Wagner (D-Allegheny)
Pennsylvania State Rep. Jewell Williams (D-Philadelphia)
Philadelphia City Council Member Jannie Blackwell
Philadelphia City Council Member W. Wilson Goode Jr.
Philadelphia City Council Member Bill Green
Philadelphia City Council Member Curtis Jones
Philadelphia City Council Member Jim Kenney
Philadelphia City Council Member Donna Reed Miller
Philadelphia City Council President Anna C. Verna
Fmr. Philadelphia City Council Member Carol Ann Campbell, Superdelegate 
Pittsburgh City Council Member Bruce Kraus
Pittsburgh City Council Member Patrick Dowd
Pittsburgh City Council Member Doug Shields, President
President, Upper Dublin Board of Commissioners (Montgomery County) Jules Mermelstein
DNC member Leon Lynch

Puerto Rico
Fmr. Secretary of Justice Pedro Pierluisi

Rhode Island
Rhode Island Attorney General Patrick C. Lynch

South Carolina
South Carolina State Sen. Glenn G. Reese (D-Inman)
South Carolina State Rep. Joseph H. Jefferson (D-Pineville)
South Carolina State Rep. J. Todd Rutherford (D-Columbia) 
South Carolina State Rep. Bakari Sellers (D-Denmark) 
Fmr. South Carolina Supreme Court Chief Justice Ernest A. Finney Jr.
Fmr. South Carolina Superintendent of Education Inez Tenenbaum
Fmr. Chairman of the South Carolina Democratic Party Joe Erwin

South Dakota
South Dakota State Sen. Julie Bartling (D-Burke)
South Dakota State Sen. Gary Hanson (D-Sisseton)
South Dakota State Sen. Scott Heidepriem (D-Sioux Falls), Minority Leader
South Dakota State Sen. Alan Hoerth (D-Burke)
South Dakota State Sen. Jim Hundstad (D-Bath)
South Dakota State Sen. Sandy Jerstad (D-Sioux Falls)
South Dakota State Sen. Tom Katus (D-Rapid City)
South Dakota State Sen. Frank Kloucek (D-Scotland)
South Dakota State Sen. Ryan Maher (D-Isabel)
South Dakota State Sen. Ben Nesselhuf (D-Vermillion)
South Dakota State Sen. James R. Peterson (D-Revillo)
South Dakota State Sen. Nancy Turbak Berry (D-Watertown)
South Dakota State Sen. Theresa Two Bulls (D-Pine Ridge)
South Dakota State Rep. Jim Bradford (D-Pine Ridge)
South Dakota State Rep. Quinten Burg (D-Wessington Springs)
South Dakota State Rep. H. Paul Dennert (D-Columbia)
South Dakota State Rep. Richard Engels (D-Hartford)
South Dakota State Rep. David Gassman (D-Canova)
South Dakota State Rep. Clayton Halverson (D-Veblen)
South Dakota State Rep. Dale Hargens (D-Miller), Minority Leader
South Dakota State Rep. Larry Lucas (D-Mission)
South Dakota State Rep. Garry Moore (D-Yankton)
South Dakota State Rep. Eldon Nygaard (D-Vermillion)
South Dakota State Rep. Bill Thompson (D-Sioux Falls)
South Dakota State Rep. Tom Van Norman (D-Eagle Butte)

Texas
Texas State Sen. Rodney Ellis (D-Fort Bend, Harris)
Texas State Sen. and Fmr. Austin, Texas Mayor Kirk Watson (D-Austin)
Texas State Sen. Royce West (D-Dallas)
Texas State Rep. Roberto R. Alonzo (D-Dallas)
Texas State Rep. Rafael Anchia (D-Dallas)
Texas State Rep. Garnet Coleman (D-Houston)
Texas State Rep. Yvonne Davis (D-Dallas)
Texas State Rep. Jim Dunnam (D-Waco)
Texas State Rep. Jessica Farrar (D-Houston)
Texas State Rep. Pete Gallego (D-Alpine), chairman of the Mexican American Legislative Caucus
Texas State Rep. Juan M. Garcia (D-Corpus Christi)
Texas State Rep. Ana Hernandez (D-Houston)
Texas State Rep. Eddie Lucio III (D-Brownsville)
Texas State Rep. Dora Olivo (D-Richmond)
Texas State Rep. Mark Strama (D-Austin)
Texas State Rep. Senfronia Thompson (D-Houston)
Houston City Council member Peter Hoyt Brown
Houston City Council member Ronald Green
Fort Worth City Council member Kathleen Hicks
Fmr. Texas Agriculture Commissioner Jim Hightower
Commissioner of Brownsville, Texas Charlie Atkinson (District 2)
Commissioner of Brownsville, Texas Edward Camarillo (District 4)
Cameron County, Texas Commissioner David Garza
Fmr. Harlingen, Texas Commissioner Heriberto "Eddie" Medrano
Fmr. Harlingen, Texas Commissioner Frank Puente
Fmr. Brownsville, Texas Commissioner Ernesto De Leon

Utah
Utah State Sen. Gene Davis (D-Salt Lake City) Senate Minority Whip
Utah State Sen. Scott McCoy (D-Salt Lake City)
Utah State Rep. Lynn Hemingway (D-Salt Lake City)
Utah State Rep. Christine Johnson (D-Salt Lake City)
Utah State Rep. Brad King (D-Price) House Minority Leader
Utah State Rep. David Litvack (D-Salt Lake City) House Minority Whip
Utah State Rep. Phil Riesen (D-Salt Lake City) Minority Caucus Manager & Utah State Rep. for Obama for America
Utah State Rep. Jen Seelig (D-Salt Lake City)
Utah State Rep. Carol Spackman Moss (D-Salt Lake City) Minority Assistant Whip
Utah State Rep. Mark Wheatley (D-Murray)
Utah State Rep. Larry Wiley (D-West Valley City)
Utah State Democratic Party Chairman Wayne Holland

Vermont
Vermont Attorney General William Sorrell

Virginia
Virginia State Sen. John S. Edwards (D-Roanoke)
Virginia State Sen. Mark Herring (D-Loudoun County)
Virginia State Sen. Edd Houck (D-Spotsylvania)
Virginia State Sen. Janet Howell (D-Fairfax)
Virginia State Sen. and Fmr. Hampton, Virginia Mayor Mamie Locke (D-Hampton)
Virginia State Sen. Louise Lucas (D-Portsmouth)
Virginia State Sen. A. Donald McEachin (D-Richmond)
Virginia State Sen. Henry L. Marsh (D-Richmond)
Virginia State Sen. Ralph Northam (D-Norfolk)
Virginia State Sen. Toddy Puller (D-Fairfax)
Virginia State Del. Kenneth Cooper Alexander (D-Norfolk)
Virginia State Del. Robert H. Brink (D-Arlington)
Virginia State Del. Ward Armstrong (D-Portsmouth)
Virginia State Del. Kristen J. Amundson (D-Mount Vernon) 
Virginia State Del. Mamye BaCote (D-Newport News)
Virginia State Del. David L. Englin (D-Alexandria)
Virginia State Del. Robert D. Hull (D-Falls Church)
Virginia State Del. Dwight Clinton Jones (D-Richmond)
Virginia State Del. Dave W. Marsden (D-Burke)
Virginia State Del. Jennifer McClellan (D-Richmond)
Virginia State Del. Kenneth R. Melvin (D-Portsmouth)
Virginia State Del. Joseph D. Morrissey (D-Richmond)
Virginia State Del. Paul F. Nichols (D-Lake Ridge)
Virginia State Del. Kenneth R. Plum (D-Reston)
Virginia State Del. James M. Scott (D-Fairfax)
Virginia State Del. Mark D. Sickles (D-Franconia)
Virginia State Del. Shannon R. Valentine (D-Lynchburg)
Virginia State Del. Onzlee Ware (D-Roanoke)
Virginia State Del. Vivian E. Watts (D-Annandale)
Chair of the Hampton Democratic Committee Gaylene Kanoyton

Washington
Washington State Senate Majority Leader Lisa Brown (D-Spokane)
Washington State Sen. Rosa Franklin (D-Tacoma)
Washington State Sen. Brian Hatfield (D-Raymond)
Washington State Sen. Ken Jacobsen (D-Seattle)
Washington State Sen. Claudia Kauffman (D-Kent)
Washington State Sen. Derek Kilmer (D-Gig Harbor)
Washington State Sen. Adam Kline (D-Seattle)
Washington State Sen. Mary Margaret Haugen (D-Camano Island)
Washington State Sen. Chris Marr (D-Spokane)
Washington State Sen. Rosemary McAuliffe (D-Seattle)
Washington State Sen. and Senate Democratic Caucus Vice-Chair Ed Murray (D-Seattle)
Washington State Sen. Eric Oemig (D-Kirkland)
Washington State Sen. Craig Pridemore (D-Vancouver)
Washington State Sen. Tim Sheldon (D-Potlatch)
Washington State Rep. Maralyn Chase (D-Shoreline)
Washington State House Speaker Frank Chopp (D-Seattle)
Washington State Rep. Mary Lou Dickerson (D-Seattle)
Washington State Rep. Deborah Eddy (D-Bellevue)
Washington State Rep. Bob Hasegawa (D-Seattle)
Washington State Rep. Christopher Hurst (D-King County)
Washington State Rep. Fred Jarrett (D-Bellevue)
Washington State Rep. Patricia Lantz (D-Bremerton)
Washington State Rep. John McCoy (D-Everett)
Washington State Rep. Jamie Pedersen (D-Seattle)
Washington State Rep. Eric Pettigrew (D-Seattle)
Washington State Rep. Dave Quall (D-Mt. Vernon/Bellingham)
Washington State Rep. Geoff Simpson (D-King County)
Washington State Rep. Larry Springer (D-Kirkland/Redmond)
Washington State Rep. Dave Upthegrove (D-Southern King County)
Washington State Rep. Brendan Williams (D-Olympia)
King County Executive Ron Sims (D-King County)
Fmr. Governor Gary Locke (D-Seattle)

Washington, D.C.
Council member Yvette Alexander (Ward 7)
Council member Muriel Bowser (Ward 4)
Council member Tommy Wells (Ward 6)
Commissioner Darrell D. Gaston (Ward 8/ANC 8B03)

West Virginia
West Virginia Sen. Dan Foster (Kanawha County)
West Virginia Sen. Jon Blair Hunter (Monongalia County)
West Virginia Sen. Larry Edgell (Wetzel County)
West Virginia Sen. Jeffrey V. Kessler (Marshall County) 
West Virginia Del. John Doyle (Jefferson County) 
West Virginia Del. Ron Fragale (Harrison County) 
West Virginia Del. Tal Hutchins (Ohio County) 
West Virginia Del. Charlene Marshall (Monongalia County) 
West Virginia Del. Clif Moore (McDowell County) 
West Virginia Del. Alex Shook (Monongalia County) 
West Virginia State Auditor Glen Gainer III
Fmr. West Virginia Secretary of State Ken Hechler
Sheriff Tom Burgoyne (Ohio County)
Sheriff John Gruzinskas (Marshall County)
Jerry Brookover (Chair, Wirt County Exec Committee)
John Saunders (former USW local president, Ohio County Dem co-chair) 
Commissioner David Sims (Ohio County)
Frank Slider (Tyler County Chair)
Fairmont Councilmember Matt Delligatti

Wisconsin
Wisconsin State Sen. Bob Jauch (D-Poplar)
Wisconsin State Assemblymember Spencer Black (D-Madison)
Wisconsin State Assemblymember Pedro Colón (D-Milwaukee)
Wisconsin State Assemblymember Jason Fields (D-Milwaukee)
Wisconsin State Assemblymember Tamara Grigsby (D-Milwaukee)
Wisconsin State Assemblymember Steve Hilgenberg (D-Dodgeville)
Wisconsin State Assemblymember Gordon Hintz (D-Oshkosh)
Wisconsin State Assemblymember Cory Mason (D-Racine)
Wisconsin State Assemblymember Joe Parisi (D-Madison)
Wisconsin State Assemblymember Donna J. Seidel (D-Wausau)
Wisconsin State Assemblymember Mike Sheridan (D-Janesville)
Wisconsin State Assemblymember Christine Sinicki (D-Milwaukee)
Wisconsin State Assemblymember Tony Staskunas (D-South Milwaukee)
Wisconsin State Assemblymember Barbara Toles (D-Milwaukee)
Wisconsin State Assemblymember Annette P. Williams (D-Milwaukee)
Wisconsin State Assemblymember Josh Zepnick (D-Milwaukee)
Fmr. Wisconsin Attorney General Peggy Lautenschlager (D-Fond du Lac)

Wyoming
Wyoming State Sen. Mike Massie (D-Laramie)
Wyoming State Sen. Ken Decaria (D-Evanston)
Wyoming State Rep. Debbie Hammons (D-Worland)
Wyoming State Rep. Ross Diercks (D-Lusk)
Wyoming State Rep. Pete Jorgensen (D-Jackson)
Wyoming State Rep. Patrick Goggles (D-Ethete)
Wyoming State Rep. Lori Millin (D-Cheyenne)
Wyoming State Rep. Mary Throne (D-Cheyenne)
Wyoming State Rep. Stan Blake (D-Green River)
Wyoming State Rep. Marty Martin (D-Rock Springs)
Wyoming State Rep. Jane Warren (D-Laramie)

References 

Barack Obama 2008 presidential campaign
Obama, Barack
2008-related lists
Barack Obama-related lists